Shau (Sho), or Lìsháù, is an extinct Kainji language of Nigeria.

References

East Kainji languages
Languages of Nigeria
Endangered Niger–Congo languages